The reasons behind terrorist attacks in Great Britain are many. During the 20th century, most attacks were carried out by various Irish Republican Army (IRA) groups and were linked to the Northern Ireland conflict (the Troubles). In the late 20th century there were also isolated attacks by Middle Eastern terrorist groups, though the vast majority of the attacks were the work of the IRA and splinter groups. During the 21st century, however, most terrorist incidents in Britain have been linked to Islamic fundamentalism.

Since 1970, there have been at least 3,395 terrorist-related deaths in the UK, the highest in western Europe. The vast majority of the deaths were linked to the Northern Ireland conflict and happened in Northern Ireland. Between 1971 and 2001, there were 430 terrorist-related deaths in Great Britain. Of these, 125 deaths were linked to the Northern Ireland conflict, and 305 deaths were linked to other causes – most of the latter deaths occurred in the Lockerbie bombing.

Great Britain

17th century
1605, 5 November: The Gunpowder Plot: Robert Catesby and some English Catholics (including Guy Fawkes) plan to murder King James I of England and VI of Scotland by putting explosives under the Houses of Parliament. It has been described as the first act of terrorism in Great Britain.

19th century

 1867, 13 December: Clerkenwell explosion: members of the Irish Republican Brotherhood (IRB), nicknamed the "Fenians", detonated a bomb against the outer wall of Clerkenwell Prison, in an attempt to free one of their comrades. The explosion damaged nearby houses, killed 12 people and caused 120 injuries.
1881–1885: Fenian dynamite campaign: the IRB carried out a bombing campaign against infrastructure, government, military and police targets in Britain.
 26 April 1897: A bomb left by an anarchist group on a Metropolitan Railway train exploded at Aldersgate Street station (now Barbican). One person, Harry Pitts, was killed and sixty were injured, ten seriously.

1939–1940
From January 1939 to March 1940, the Irish Republican Army (IRA) carried out a campaign of bombing and sabotage against the civil, economic, and military infrastructure of Britain. It was known as the S-Plan or Sabotage Campaign. During the campaign, the IRA carried out almost 300 attacks and acts of sabotage in Britain, killing seven people and injuring 96. Most of the casualties occurred in the Coventry bombing on 25 August 1939.

1970s

 1971, 12 January: Two bombs exploded at the house of government minister Robert Carr. This attack was one of 25 carried out by the Angry Brigade between August 1970 and August 1971. The Bomb Squad was established at Scotland Yard in January 1971 to target the group, and they were apprehended in August of that year.
 1971, 31 October:  A bomb exploded in the Post Office Tower in London causing extensive damage but no injuries. The "Kilburn Battalion" of the IRA claimed responsibility for the explosion but The Angry Brigade also claimed to have carried out the attack. It's likely it was the work of the Angry Brigade and not the IRA. 
 1972, 22 February: Aldershot bombing: The Official Irish Republican Army ('Official' IRA) detonated a car bomb at Aldershot British Army base, Hampshire. The blast killed seven civilian staff.
 1972, 19 September: The Palestinian terrorist group Black September posted a letter bomb to the Israeli embassy in London killing an Israeli diplomat.
 1973, 8 March: The Provisional Irish Republican Army ('Provisional' IRA) planted four car bombs in London. Two of the bombs exploded outside the Old Bailey and the Ministry of Agriculture, injuring dozens. The bombs outside New Scotland Yard and an army recruitment office near Whitehall were defused.
 1973, 10 September: The Provisional IRA set off bombs at London's King's Cross and  stations, injuring 21 people.
1973, 18 December: 1973 Westminster bombing: An IRA car bomb exploded outside the Home Office building in Millbank, London, injuring 60 people.
 1974, 4 February: M62 coach bombing: An IRA bomb exploded aboard a bus carrying British soldiers and several of their family members in Yorkshire, killing nine soldiers and three civilians.
 1974, 26 March: Claro Barracks at Ripon, North Yorkshire; Two stores and the main NAAFI building were damaged by three IRA bombs planted by Peter McMullen.  Another device was then destroyed in a controlled explosion by army bomb disposal experts in the main barracks, where 100 soldiers had been sleeping. The 49-year-old manageress of the NAAFI shop suffered facial cuts from flying glass during the attack.
 1974, 11 June: Queen Elizabeth Barracks, Strensall near York, North Yorkshire;  A bomb (thrown over the perimeter fence?) destroyed most of the Green Howards Band's musical instruments.  
 1974, 17 June: Houses of Parliament bombing: An IRA bomb exploded at the Houses of Parliament, causing extensive damage and injuring 11 people.
 1974 17 July: Tower of London bombing: A bomb exploded in the Tower of London, killing one and injuring 41.
 1974, 5 October: Guildford pub bombings: IRA bombs exploded in two pubs frequented by off-duty British military personnel in Guildford, Surrey. Four soldiers and a civilian were killed and 44 injured.
 1974, 22 October: An IRA bomb exploded in Brooks's gentleman's club in London, injuring three people.
 1974, 7 November: An IRA bomb exploded in a pub frequented by British military personnel in Woolwich, London, killing a soldier and a civilian.
 1974, 14 November: James Patrick McDade, Lieutenant in the Birmingham Battalion, of the Provisional Irish Republican Army (IRA) was killed in a premature explosion whilst planting a bomb at the Coventry telephone exchange in 1974.
 1974, 21 November: Birmingham pub bombings: IRA bombs exploded in two pubs in Birmingham, killing 21 people and injuring 182.
 1974, 18 December: 1974 Bristol bombing: Two IRA bombs exploded in one of Bristol's shopping districts in the run up to Christmas, injuring 17.
 1975, 27 January: An IRA bomb exploded at Lewis's department store in Manchester, England. Following a warning telephoned to the Press Association at 16:07 pm, the bomb exploded 17 minutes later injuring 19 people, one of them seriously. Seven bombs were also planted in London, five of them exploded injuring six people.
 1975, 27 August: Caterham Arms pub bombing: An IRA bomb exploded in a pub frequented by British military personnel in Caterham, Surrey, injuring 33.
1975, 5 September: An IRA bomb exploded in the lobby of the Hilton Hotel, London, killing two people and injuring 63.
1975, 9 October: Green Park tube station bombing: An IRA bomb exploded by Green Park tube station in London, killing one.
1975, 18 November: IRA members threw a bomb into Walton's restaurant in London, killing two people and injuring 23.
 1975, 27 November: IRA gunmen assassinated political activist and television personality Ross McWhirter in Enfield Town, London.
 1975, 6–12 December: Balcombe Street siege: Four IRA members, who were fleeing from the police, barricaded themselves inside a flat in London and held the two occupants hostage. The siege lasted for six days and ended when the IRA members surrendered and released the hostages.
 1975, 20 December: Biddy Mulligan's pub bombing: The Ulster Defence Association (UDA) bombed Biddy Mulligan's pub in the Kilburn area of London. Five people were injured. It said it bombed the pub because it was frequented by Irish republican sympathizers.
1976, 4 March: Cannon Street train bombing: An IRA bomb exploded in an empty train at Cannon Street station in London, injuring eight.
1976, 15 March: West Ham station attack: An IRA bomb exploded on a train at West Ham station in London, injuring seven. The bomber then shot two people while fleeing, killing one.
1976, 27 March: Olympia bombing: An IRA bomb exploded at the Olympia, London, killing one and injuring over 80 people.
1977, 31 December: Explosive device detonated inside the passenger compartment of car owned by the Embassy of the Syrian Arab Republic killing two members of Syrian embassy staff.
 1978, 17 December: Co-ordinated IRA bombs exploded in Manchester, Liverpool, Coventry, Bristol and Southampton, injuring at least seven in Bristol.
 1979, 17 January: A bomb exploded at a Texaco oil terminal on Canvey Island, Essex, tearing a hole in a tank that was initially thought to contain aviation fuel.
 1979, 17 February: Glasgow pub bombings: The Ulster Volunteer Force (UVF) bombed two pubs frequented by Catholics in Glasgow, Scotland. Both pubs were wrecked and a number of people were wounded. It said it bombed the pubs because they were used for Irish republican fundraising.
 1979, 30 March: Airey Neave killed when a bomb exploded under his car as he drove out of the Palace of Westminster car park. The Irish National Liberation Army (INLA) claimed responsibility.

1980s

 1980, 30 April: Iranian Embassy siege: Six Iranian Arab gunmen stormed the Iranian Embassy in London and took hostages. The siege lasted for six days, until the hostages were rescued in a raid by the SAS which was broadcast live on TV. Two of the hostages were killed, while the hostage-takers were all either killed or captured.
 1981 January: Bomb inside RAF band barracks in RAF Uxbridge. A security patrol discovered the bomb surrounded by drums of petrol. The barracks were evacuated but the device exploded before the bomb disposal arrived. The blast was heard up to 2 miles away. There were two minor injuries.
 1981, 10 October: The IRA detonated a bomb outside Chelsea Barracks, London, killing two and injuring 39.
 1981, 26 October: The IRA bombed a Wimpy Bar on Oxford Street, killing Kenneth Howorth, the Metropolitan Police explosives officer attempting to defuse it.
 1982, 14 March: The bombing of the London offices of the African National Congress (ANC), which opposed the apartheid government of South Africa, wounding one person who was living upstairs. General Johann Coetzee, former head of the South African Security Police, and seven other policemen accepted responsibility for the attack after the end of the apartheid government.
 1982, 20 July: Hyde Park and Regent's Park bombings: IRA bombs exploded during British military ceremonies in Hyde Park and Regent's Park, London, killing eleven soldiers of the Household Cavalry and the Royal Green Jackets.
 1983, 17 December: Harrods bombing: An IRA car bomb exploded outside Harrods department store in London, following a telephoned warning. Five people were killed, including three police officers, and the sixth victim – another police officer – died in hospital from his injuries a week later. 90 other people were injured but survived.
 1984, 12 October: Brighton hotel bombing: In an attempt to assassinate Prime Minister Margaret Thatcher, the IRA detonated a bomb in the Grand Brighton Hotel during the Conservative Party conference. It killed five Conservative Party members, including MP Anthony Berry.
 1988, 21 December: Pan Am Flight 103 was blown up by a bomb in a suitcase while in flight over Lockerbie, Scotland after taking off from Heathrow. All 259 of the plane's passengers and crew were killed, along with 11 Lockerbie residents, claiming a total of 270 lives.
 1989, 3 August: A man using the alias Mustafa Mahmoud Mazeh accidentally blew himself up along with two floors of a central London hotel while preparing a bomb intended to kill author Salman Rushdie.
 1989, 22 September: Deal barracks bombing: Eleven Royal Marines bandsmen were killed and 22 injured when an IRA bomb exploded at the Royal Marines base in Deal, Kent.

1990s
 1990, 14 May: The IRA bombed an army education centre in Eltham, London, injuring seven.
 1990, 16 May: The IRA bombed a minibus at an army recruitment centre in Wembley, London, killing one soldier and injuring four.
 1990, 1 June: A British soldier was killed and two wounded in an IRA gun attack at Lichfield City railway station, Staffordshire.
 1990, 9 June: Honourable Artillery Company bombing: The IRA detonated a bomb at the Honourable Artillery Company's barracks in London, injuring 19.
 1990, 26 June: Carlton Club bombing: The IRA bombed a London club for Conservative politicians, fatally wounding one and injuring 20.
 1990, 20 July: London Stock Exchange bombing: The IRA detonated a bomb at the London Stock Exchange causing damage to the building but no injuries.
 1990, 30 July: Ian Gow, Conservative MP, was assassinated by the IRA when a booby trap bomb exploded under his car outside his home in East Sussex. 
 1991, 4 January: An IRA bomb exploded and a shot was fired at the entrance to Territorial Army Firing Range, Cannock Chase, Staffordshire. No injuries.
 1991, 7 February: The IRA carried out a mortar attack of 10 Downing Street, in an attempt to assassinate Prime Minister John Major and his cabinet. One of the shells exploded in the back garden of 10 Downing Street but there were no deaths.
 1991, 18 February: An IRA bomb exploded at Victoria Station. One man killed and 38 people injured.
 1991, 15 November: An IRA bomb exploded in St Albans city centre. Two fatalities, both members of the provisional IRA (Patricia Black and Frankie Ryan), were the only casualties.
 1992, 28 February: An IRA bomb exploded at London Bridge station, injuring 29 people.
 1992, 10 April: Baltic Exchange bombing: A large IRA truck bomb exploded outside the Baltic Exchange building in the City of London, following a telephoned warning. It killed three people and caused £800 million worth of damage – more than the total damaged caused by the 10,000 explosions that had occurred during the Troubles in Northern Ireland up to that point. A few hours later a bomb exploded in Staples Corner.
 1992, 25 August:  The IRA planted three firebombs in Shrewsbury, Shropshire.  Bombs were placed in Shoplatch, The Charles Darwin Centre and Shrewsbury Castle, the latter causing the most damage as the castle housed the Shropshire Regimental Museum and many priceless historical artifacts were lost and damaged by fire and smoke.  No fatalities or injuries were recorded.
 1992, 12 October: Sussex Arms bombing: A bomb exploded in the gents' toilet of a pub in Covent Garden, killing one person and injuring four others.
 1992, 16 November: IRA planted a bomb at the Canary Wharf, but was spotted by security guards. The bomb failed to detonate.
 1992, 3 December: The IRA detonated two car bombs in central Manchester, injuring 65 people.
 1992, 10 December: Wood Green Shopping City bombing. Two IRA bin bombs injure 11 people.
 1993, 28 January: 1993 Harrods bombing: Far-left Red Action members together with the IRA bombed Harrods in London, injuring four.
 1993, 26 February: Warrington bomb attacks (Part 1): IRA bombs attached to gas storage facilities exploded, causing widespread damage and a dramatic fireball. PC Mark Toker was shot three times by the bombers after pulling over their van hours before.
 1993, 27 February: Camden Town bombing: An IRA bomb exploded on Camden High Street in London, injuring 18.
 1993, 20 March: Warrington bomb attacks (Part 2): Two bombs exploded in litter bins in a shopping precinct in Warrington, Cheshire, killing a three-year-old boy and injuring 55 people. The second bomb occurred within a minute of the first, directly in the path of many of those fleeing from the initial blast. A 12-year-old boy became the second fatality when he died in hospital from his injuries several days later. A warning had been telephoned to a Samaritans in Liverpool 30 minutes before the detonation, but hadn't specified Warrington.
 1993, 24 April: Bishopsgate bombing: The IRA detonated a huge (equivalent to 1.2 tonnes of TNT) truck bomb in the City of London at Bishopsgate. Police had received a telephoned warning but were still evacuating the area at the time of the explosion. A newspaper photographer was killed, over 40 people were injured, and £350 million worth of damage was caused.
 1994, March: Heathrow mortar attacks: The IRA launched a series of mortar attacks on Heathrow Airport near London. The attacks caused severe disruption but little damage.
 1994, 26–27 July: A group of Palestinians detonated two car bombs in London, one outside the Israeli embassy and one outside Balfour House, home to a Jewish charity. The attacks injured twenty people.
 1994, 13 August: 2.5 lbs of Semtex packed into a bicycle left outside Woolworths in Bognor Regis, exploded damaging 15 shops.  A similar bomb found in nearby Brighton.
 1996, 9 February: London Docklands bombing: The IRA detonated a powerful truck bomb in the Canary Wharf financial district of London, following telephoned warnings. The blast caused severe damage and killed two people.
 1996, 18 February: Aldwych bus bombing: An improvised high explosive device detonated prematurely on a bus travelling along Aldwych in central London, killing Edward O'Brien, the IRA member transporting the device and injuring eight others.
 1996, 15 June: Manchester bombing: The IRA detonated a powerful truck bomb in central Manchester, following a telephoned warning. It was the biggest bomb detonated in Britain since the Second World War. It caused widespread damage and injured over 200 people, but there were no deaths.
 1999, 17 April, 24 April, 30 April: 1999 London nail bombings: David Copeland set off three nail bombs in London targeting the black, Bangladeshi and gay communities respectively, killing three people (including a pregnant woman) and injuring 129. Copeland, a far-right extremist, was convicted of murder on 30 June 2000.

Refer also to the list of IRA terrorist incidents presented to Parliament between 1980 and 1994, listed halfway down the page here

2000s
 
 2000, 20 September: The Real IRA fired an RPG-22 rocket launcher at the MI6 headquarters in London.
 2001, 4 March: The Real IRA detonated a car bomb outside the BBC Television Centre in London, damaging the front of the building and injuring one person.
2001, 3 August: The Real IRA detonated a car bomb in Ealing, London, damaging buildings and injuring seven people.
 2005, 7 July: 7/7 central London bombings conducted by four separate Islamist extremist suicide bombers, which targeted civilians using the public transport system during the morning rush hour. Three bombs were detonated on three separate trains on the London Underground and one on a double-decker bus. As well as the suicide bombers, 52 other people were killed and around 700 more were injured. It was the UK's worst terrorist incident since the 1988 Lockerbie bombing and the first Islamist suicide attack in the country.
 2007, January–February: Miles Cooper letter bomb campaign. Miles Cooper said he was motivated by anti-authoritarianism and opposition to surveillance.
2007, 30 June: Two Islamist terrorists drove a Jeep Cherokee loaded with propane canisters into the glass doors of the Glasgow Airport terminal, setting it ablaze. Five people were injured and the only death was of one of the perpetrators, who later died in hospital from his injuries. It was the first terrorist attack to take place in Scotland since the Lockerbie bombing in 1988.

2010s

 2010, 14 May: MP Stephen Timms was stabbed during his constituency surgery by Roshonara Choudhry, a British Islamic extremist, in an attempt to kill him. She was found guilty of attempted murder and jailed for life with a minimum term of 15 years. Choudhry was the first Al-Qaeda sympathiser to attempt an assassination in Britain.
 2013, 29 April to 12 July: Pavlo Lapshyn, a Ukrainian student and right-wing extremist, fatally stabbed Birmingham resident Mohammed Saleem on 29 April. Lapshyn later detonated a home-made bomb outside a mosque in Walsall on 21 June. On 28 June, Lapshyn detonated a second home-made bomb near a mosque in Wolverhampton, and attacked a mosque in Tipton with an improvised explosive device containing nails on 12 July. He later admitted to police that he wished to start a "race war" and was sentenced to serve at least 40 years.
 2013, 22 May: A British soldier, Lee Rigby, was murdered in an attack in Woolwich by Michael Adebolajo and Michael Adebowale, two Islamist extremists armed with a handgun, knives and a cleaver. Both men were sentenced to life imprisonment, with Adebolajo given a whole life order and Adebowale ordered to serve at least 45 years.
2014, 10–14 February: The New Irish Republican Army (NIRA) claims responsibility for a series of parcel bombs sent to army recruitment offices in Oxford, Brighton, Canterbury, Slough, Aldershot, Reading and Chatham.
 2016, 16 June: Murder of Jo Cox – Thomas Mair, a 52-year-old white nationalist, shot and stabbed the MP Jo Cox outside a surgery in Birstall, West Yorkshire, and severely wounded a passerby who came to her aid. The attack was treated as an act of terrorism, and in sentencing Mair to life imprisonment the judge said "There is no doubt that this murder was done for the purpose of advancing a political, racial and ideological cause namely that of violent white supremacism and exclusive nationalism most associated with Nazism and its modern forms".
 2017, 22 March: 2017 Westminster attack – Khalid Masood, a 52-year-old Islamist, drove a car into pedestrians on Westminster Bridge, killing four and injuring almost fifty. He ran into the grounds of the Palace of Westminster and fatally stabbed police officer Keith Palmer, before being shot dead by police. The attack was treated as an act of terrorism motivated by Islamic extremism.
2017, 22 May: Manchester Arena bombing – An Islamist suicide bomber, 22-year-old Salman Abedi, blew himself up at Manchester Arena as people were leaving a concert, killing 22 and injuring 139. It became the deadliest terrorist attack in Britain since the 7/7 London bombings in 2005. Many of the victims were children or teenagers, the youngest being an eight-year-old girl.
 2017, 3 June: 2017 London Bridge attack – Three Islamists drove a van into pedestrians on London bridge before stabbing people in and around pubs in nearby Borough Market. Eight people were killed and at least 48 wounded. The attackers were shot dead by police eight minutes after the incident was reported. All three were wearing fake suicide bomb vests.
2017, 19 June: Finsbury Park attack – Darren Osborne, a 47 year old British man, drove a van into Muslim worshippers near Finsbury Park Mosque, London. A man who had earlier collapsed and was receiving first aid died at the scene. The incident was investigated by counter-terrorism police as a terrorist attack. On 23 June, Osborne was charged with terrorism-related murder and attempted murder. In February 2018 at Woolwich Crown Court, he was found guilty on both counts and was sentenced to life imprisonment with a minimum term of 43 years.
2017, 15 September: Parsons Green bombing – The London tube train was targeted and witnesses reported a flash and bang. Thirty people were injured, mostly with flash burns and crush injuries, but there were no fatalities. The threat level was raised to its highest point of critical soon after. Ahmed Hassan, who committed the bombing, received a life sentence with a minimum term of 34 years.
2018, 14 August: 2018 Westminster car attack – A Ford Fiesta ran down pedestrians outside the palace of Westminster. The car then went on to crash into the security barrier, after aiming at two police officers.The man who carried out the attack received a life sentence with a minimum term of 15 years.
2018, 31 December: Mahdi Mohamud, a Dutch national from a Somali family, stabbed three in a knife attack at Manchester Victoria station. Mohamud shouted "Allahu Akbar!" and "Long live the Caliphate!" during the attack. Despite suffering from paranoid schizophrenia, Mahomud was convicted of a terror offence and attempted murder of three people due to his possession of significant amounts of extremist material and the attack's extensive planning. 
2019, 29 November: 2019 London Bridge stabbing – On 29 November 2019, police were called to a stabbing near London Bridge, in Central London, England, at 1:58 pm. A statement said that one man was detained, and "a number of people" were injured. Two people were killed in the attack and three were left injured. The attacker, 28 year old Usman Khan, was shot dead by police and confirmed dead on the scene.

2020s 

 2020, 9 January: Two inmates at Whitemoor prison in Cambridgeshire wearing realistic fake suicide vests, and carrying improvised bladed weapons, stabbed one prison officer several times causing serious injuries and harming several others.
 2020, 2 February: 2020 Streatham stabbing – Sudesh Amman, wearing a fake suicide vest similar to the one used in the 2019 London Bridge stabbing, was shot dead by armed police after stabbing and injuring two people in Streatham, London Borough of Lambeth. One of the victims sustained life-threatening injuries.
 2020, 20 June: 2020 Reading stabbings – On 20 June 2020, Khairi Saadallah, shouting "Allahu Akbar", attacked two groups of people socialising in Forbury Gardens, a public park in the centre of Reading, killing three and injuring three others. On 11 January 2021, he was sentenced to life imprisonment without the possibility of parole. The sentencing judge, Mr Justice Sweeney said that it was a terrorist attack and that the purpose was to advance an extremist Islamic cause.
 2021, 15 October: Murder of David Amess – Ali Harbi Ali stabbed MP Sir David Amess at his constituency surgery and was sentenced to life imprisonment with a whole life order.
 2021, 14 November: Liverpool Women's Hospital bombing – Emad Al-Swealmeen, carrying a homemade bomb, arrived at the Liverpool Women's Hospital by taxi. The bomb exploded, killing him and injuring the driver. The incident was quickly described as terrorist.
 2022, 30 October: Dover firebomb attack - Andrew Leak threw three petrol bombs attached to fireworks at the perimeter fence of the Western Jet Foil migrant processing centre in Dover, Kent before killing himself at a nearby petrol station. Two people sustained minor injuries.

Prevented, failed or aborted attacks
These are known attacks which could have constituted a threat to life had they worked or been large enough. The list does not include attacks that were only at the planning stage, but were not actually in operation.

 1605, 5 November: Gunpowder Plot: A pro-Catholic conspiracy attempted to assassinate King James VI and I during the State Opening of Parliament where the polity of England had assembled, including the lords spiritual and temporal and members of parliament. 36 barrels of gunpowder were found under the Palace of Westminster being guarded by Guy Fawkes. The attempt was foiled and Fawkes and the leaders of the conspiracy were convicted of high treason and sentenced to be hanged, drawn and quartered.
 1894, 15 February: Anarchist Martial Bourdin was killed by his own bomb outside the Royal Observatory in Greenwich Park. There were no other casualties. Joseph Conrad's novel The Secret Agent, published in 1907, drew on this event.
 1981, January: the Provisional Irish Republican Army (IRA) planted a bomb in the Suvla barrack block at RAF Uxbridge. The device was discovered, and the 35 RAF musicians and 15 airmen living there were evacuated before it exploded.
 1985: Police found 10 grenades, seven petrol bombs and two detonators at the home of former Group Development Director for the British National Party, Tony Lecomber, after he was injured by a nail bomb that he was carrying to the offices of the Workers' Revolutionary Party. Convicted under the Explosive Substances Act 1883.
 1992, 1 March: An IRA bomb was defused by police at White Hart Lane train station in London. 
 1993, 23 October: In Reading, Berkshire, an IRA bomb exploded at a signal post near the railway station, some hours after 5 lb (2 kg) of Semtex was found in the toilets of the station. The resulting closure of the railway line and evacuation of the station caused travel chaos for several hours, but no-one was injured.
 1996, 24 April: 1996 Hammersmith Bridge bombing attempt.
 2000, 1 June: Real IRA suspected of planting a high-explosive device attached to a girder under the south side of Hammersmith Bridge, which detonated at 4:30 am.
 2000, 17 November: Police arrested Moinul Abedin. His Birmingham house contained bomb-making instructions, equipment, and traces of the explosive HTMD. A nearby lock-up rented by Abedin contained 100 kg of the chemical components of HTMD. In March 2020, Jonathan Evans, former Director General of MI5 gave an interview and commented on the case: 'The first indication that we had an actual, live, real threat in the U.K....the first arrest of anybody in the U.K. linked to al-Qaeda who was planning an attack here...with the fall of the Taliban and the Afghan camps in 2001/2002, evidence came to light which demonstrated that this was an at least inspired al-Qaeda plot of some sort'.
2001, 3 November: The 2001 Birmingham bombing by the Real Irish Republican Army. The bomb failed to explode.
 2005, 21 July: The 21 July 2005 London bombings, also conducted by four would-be Islamic suicide bombers on the public transport, whose bombs failed to detonate.
 2006, 28 September: Talbot Street bomb-making haul.
 2007, 1 February: Plot to behead a British Muslim soldier in order to undermine the morale of the British Army. Pervaiz Khan, Basiru Gassama, Zahoor Iqbal, Mohammed Irfan, and Hamid Elasmar were sentenced to between 40 months and life for the plot. 
 2007, 29 June: London car bombs. Bilal Abdullah and Kafeel Ahmed were found to be involved in planting the bombs. Both were also responsible for the Glasgow Airport Attack.
 2008, 22 May: Exeter attempted bombing in a café toilet by an Islamist extremist, injuring only the perpetrator.
 2009, 3 September: Manchester Piccadilly multiple suicide bomber plot. In 2009, Pakistani national Abid Naseer, was one of 12 suspects arrested on suspicion of being part of a Manchester Terror cell, after arriving in the UK a year before. All were released on insufficient evidence, but ordered to be deported from the UK. Naseer's deportation to Pakistan was prevented on human rights grounds, as he was ruled 'likely to be  mistreated'. In 2013, on further evidence from Al-Qaeda sources, including documents from the bin Laden Raid, he was extradited to the US, and on 4 March 2015 was found guilty of masterminding an Al-Qaeda directed plot to synchronize multiple suicide bombings around Manchester's Arndale Centre and Piccadilly shopping centre in a coordinated attack involving other locations, including the New York Subway, with other cells.
 2012, June: Five Islamic extremists plotted to bomb an English Defence League rally in Dewsbury but arrived late and were arrested when returning to Birmingham. A sixth was also convicted.
 2013, April: As part of  Operation Pitsford, 11 Muslim extremists are jailed for a plotting terror attack involving suicide bombers.
 2015, 7 July: Attempted anniversary London 7/7 bomb plot. Mohammed Rehman and Sana Ahmed Khan were sentenced to life imprisonment for preparing an act of terrorism. They had 10 kg of urea nitrate. Rehman called himself the 'silent bomber' and asked his Twitter followers to choose between the Westfield London shopping centre or the London Underground for the planned suicide bomb.
 2017, 25 August: Mohiussunnath Chowdhury slashed police officers with a sword outside Buckingham Palace while shouting "Allahu akbar" repeatedly. He was found not guilty of terrorism by a court,  but was charged with a single count of preparing an act of terrorism. During and after release from prison, he went on to plan further terror attacks, and was arrested in 2018.
 2017, 28 November: In an attempt to kill Prime Minister Theresa May, Islamic State terrorist Naa'imur Zakariyah Rahman was arrested in London after collecting a fake bomb and suicide vest from undercover operatives.
 2018, February: Ethan Stables, a white supremacist, was arrested plotting a machete attack in an LGBT parade.
2018, 9 April: Fatah Mohammed Abdullah "bought more than 8,000 matches, fireworks, fuses, explosives precursors – or substances that could be used to manufacture explosives – and a remote control detonator." He pleaded guilty to inciting people to commit terror attacks in Germany, and buying explosive equipment.
 2019, 3 July: Mohiussunnath Chowdhury and his sister were arrested for planning to target London tourist sites including Madame Tussauds, Piccadilly Circus, and London's Gay Pride parade, using a vehicle, knife and gun. He was convicted of plotting terror acts on 10 February 2020.
2020, 31 January: The Continuity IRA was responsible for planting a bomb on a lorry in Lurgan due to explode on the day the United Kingdom left the EU. The "Brexit Day bomb plot" was intended to occur on 31 January 2020 coinciding with the Brexit withdrawal. The Police Service of Northern Ireland (PSNI) was given two anonymous tips that a bomb inside a lorry would be on a ferry heading from Belfast Harbour to Cairnryan, Scotland. A search at Belfast Harbour failed to find a device. On 5 February 2020, the bomb was found inside a lorry on the Silverwood Industrial Estate in Lurgan, County Armagh, Northern Ireland, after searching 400 lorries. The device was made safe by a bomb disposal team. As of February 2020, the PSNI were investigating the incident and believed the Continuity Irish Republican Army (CIRA) was responsible for the failed plot.
 2020, 21 February: Islamic State supporter Safiyya Shaikh was arrested after she admitted plotting to blow herself up in a bomb attack on St Paul's Cathedral, stating that she would "kill 'til I'm dead"
 2023, 20 January: A student nurse by the name of Mohammad Farooq, aged 27, was arrested after leaving an explosive device outside the maternity ward of St James's University Hospital in the city of Leeds. At the time of arrest, he was caught in possession of a Gediz 9mm PAK semi-automatic pistol. Prosecutors added that he was inspired by radical Islam, and that he carried out "hostile reconnaissance" of an RAF base on 10 and 18 January after carrying out online research and intended on carrying out a 'lone wolf' attack. He was charged with engaging in conduct with the intention of committing acts of terrorism between 12 July 2022 and 20 January 2023.
     
Given the nature of counter-terrorism, successes in preventing terrorist attacks in the UK will not always come to light, or not be as heavily promoted as intelligence failures.  However, during the police advocacy of 90-day detention in relation to the Terrorism Act 2006 they produced documents listing all the cases about which they could not go into details.
Authorities often state, without going into details, numbers of attacks prevented, e.g. 12 attacks were reported in March 2017 to have been thwarted in the previous year, some only hours before they were to have been attempted.

Arrests, detentions, and other incidents related to the Terrorism Acts
These are cases where either the Terrorism Acts were invoked, or which the authorities alleged were terrorist in nature at the time. This list includes both plots that were foiled at an early stage before any materials were actually assembled, and totally innocent suspects.

1997, 11 April: Eight members of the Provisional IRA – including an Irish-American that served in the US Marine – were on trial after a July 1996 plot to blow up six electrical stations knocking out electricity in the London and South East England region, foiled by police and MI5.
 2003, 5 January: Wood Green ricin plot, where police arrested six Algerian men accused of manufacturing ricin to use for a poison attack on the London Underground. No poison was  found, and all men were acquitted of all terror charges, except for Kamel Bourgass who stabbed four police officers during his arrest in Manchester several days later. He was convicted of the murder of the officer he killed (the others he stabbed survived). He was also convicted of plotting to poison members of the public with ricin and other poisons. Two of the suspects in the plot were subsequently convicted of possessing false passports.
 2003, October: Andrew Rowe arrested in Dover after being detained as he entered the Channel Tunnel in France.  Convicted as a "global terrorist" and sentenced to 15 years in prison on 23 September 2005 on the basis of traces of explosives on a pair of socks and a code translation book.
 2004, 30 March: Seven men arrested in West Sussex in possession of 600 kg of ammonium nitrate fertilizer, as part of Operation Crevice.
 2004, 3 August: Fourteen men arrested, but only eight charged in relation to the 2004 Financial buildings plot following the leak of the identity of an Al-Qaeda double-agent. The men possessed detailed plans for attacking financial buildings in the US, but no actual bomb-making equipment. Their leader, Dhiren Barot, pleaded guilty at his trial on 12 October 2006, and was imprisoned for life.
 2004, 24 September: Four men arrested in the Holiday Inn in Brent Cross trying to buy red mercury, a mythical substance which could purportedly be used to construct a nuclear bomb, from a newspaper reporter.  One man was released three days later, while the other three were cleared at their trial on 25 July 2006, during which the jury was told that "whether red mercury does or does not exist is irrelevant".
 2005, 22 July: The Metropolitan Police killed totally uninvolved Jean Charles de Menezes, shooting him in the head on a train over suspicions of an imminent terrorist attack, during counter-terrorism Operation Kratos.
 2005, 28 July: David Mery arrested at Southwark tube station on suspicion of terrorism for wearing a jacket "too warm for the season" and carrying a bulky rucksack. All charges were dropped on 31 August. It took four more years for the police to apologise for the "unlawful arrest, detention and search of [his] home".
 2005, 28 September: Walter Wolfgang, who had been ejected from the Labour Party Conference after shouting "Nonsense!" at Foreign Secretary Jack Straw, was briefly held under Terrorism Act 2000 powers when he attempted to go back in.
 2005, 22 December: Abu Bakr Mansha, described by his barrister as an "utter incompetent", was accused of planning to murder a British soldier who had served in the Iraq War, and convicted under the Terrorism Act for possessing a document that was "likely to be useful to a person committing or preparing an act of terrorism". He was sentenced to six years' imprisonment.
 2006, 2 June: The 2 June 2006 Forest Gate raid (on a house in Forest Gate) saw the arrest of two suspects, one who was shot in the shoulder, on charges of conspiring to release a chemical weapon in the form of a suicide vest. The suspects were cleared of suspicion and released days later.
 2006, 10 August: The 2006 transatlantic aircraft plot to blow up 10 planes flying from Heathrow saw the arrest of 24 people from their homes in Britain, chaos at airports as security measures were put in place, and numerous high-level statements from US and UK officials. Eight people were put on trial, and three found guilty of conspiracy to murder. It was shown at their trial how bottles of liquid could be made into effective bombs. Following this incident, carriage of liquids in hand luggage on aircraft was restricted internationally to very small amounts. Rashid Rauf, suspected to have been the link between the UK plotters and Pakistan, escaped to Pakistan, where he was arrested, but escaped again on his way to an extradition hearing. It was reported that he was killed in a US airstrike in North Waziristan in November 2008.
 2006, 23 August: The 2006 Cheetham Hill terrorism arrests, where four men were arrested in the Manchester vicinity over the course of a month, and charged with financing terrorism.
 2006, 1 September: The Jameah Islameah School in Sussex was cordoned off for over three weeks and searched by a hundred police officers. Twelve men were arrested as part of the operation as they ate in a Chinese restaurant in London.
 2007, 1 November: Police searching for indecent images of children arrested British People's Party local organiser Martyn Gilleard in Goole, East Riding of Yorkshire under the Terrorism Act, over explosives found in his home. He was subsequently charged with possession of material for terrorist purposes and collection of information useful to a terrorist, and also pleaded guilty to possessing 39,000 indecent images. He was jailed for 16 years.
 2008, 14 May: The Nottingham Two were arrested and detained for six days under the Terrorism Act 2000. A postgraduate student had downloaded a 140-page English translation of an Al-Qaeda document from the United States Department of Justice website for his PhD research on militant Islam. He sent it to a friend in the Modern Language department, for printing. Both were cleared of terrorism-related offences, but the friend was immediately re-arrested on immigration grounds.
 2008, 14 September: Oxford graduate Stephen Clarke arrested after someone thought they saw him taking a photograph of a sealed man-hole cover outside the central public library in Manchester. He was arrested under section 41 of the Terrorism Act 2000, held for 36 hours while his house and computer were searched, and then released without charge. No photographs of man-hole covers were found.
 2009, 13 February: Nine men arrested on the M65 motorway under section 40 of the Terrorism Act 2000. Six were kept hand-cuffed in the back of a van for seven hours. The remaining three were detained for six days. No one was charged.
 2011, 19 September: West Midlands Police arrested a woman who lived in the Alum Rock area of Birmingham. Salma Kabal, 22, appeared in court on 16 November 2011 accused of failing to inform police that her husband, Ashik Ali, planned to kill himself. The official charge was that she "knew or believed might be of material assistance in securing the apprehension, prosecution or conviction of another person for an offence involving the commission, preparation or instigation of an act of terrorism".
 2011, 15 November:  West Midlands Counter Terrorism Unit arrested four people at their homes who were from Sparkhill Birmingham, on suspicion of conducting terrorist offences. The four men appeared in court in Westminster on 19 November 2011 charged with terrorism offences. They were named as Khobaib Hussain, Ishaaq Hussain and Shahid Kasam Khan, all 19, and Naweed Mahmood Ali, 24. They were charged with fundraising for terrorist purposes and for travelling to Pakistan for terrorist training.
 2012, 28 June: The two men, aged 18 and 32, were arrested at separate residential addresses in east London by officers from the Metropolitan Police Counter-Terrorism Command, at 7am on Thursday. It was believed the men were involved in a bomb plot concerning the 2012 London Summer Olympics. A Scotland Yard spokesman said: "At approximately 07:00 hrs today, Thursday June 28, officers from the counter-terrorism command arrested two men under the Terrorism Act 2000 on suspicion of the commission, preparation or instigation of acts of terrorism. The men were arrested at separate residential addresses in east London. Both addresses are currently being searched under the Terrorism Act 2000".
2014, 20 August: Four men were arrested in Northern Ireland over a New IRA plot to send letter bombs to targets in England, including home secretary Theresa May.
 2017, 5 September: Three men, including two serving British soldiers, were arrested and later charged with several offences relating to membership of the neo-Nazi National Action terrorist organisation and preparing for acts of terrorism.
 2018, 18 April. A 26-year-old male was arrested by Kent Police and the Counter Terrorism Police at his home address in Rochester, Kent. On 1 May 2018, following a custody extension, he appeared at Westminster Magistrates Court where he was charged with planning terrorist attacks on London tourist attractions, namely Oxford Street and Madame Tussauds. He was also charged with attempting to join Daesh, otherwise known as Islamic State, in the Philippines. He was not granted bail, and was remanded in custody until he appears before the Central Criminal Court on 11 May 2018. He pleaded guilty at the Old Bailey on 10 August 2018 and is due to be sentenced on 2 November 2018.
2019, 31 August: Anwar Driouich from Middlesbrough was arrested in North London and "charged with one offence of possessing an explosive substance and seven offences of possessing a document likely to be useful to a person committing or preparing an act of terrorism". He was sentenced to 20 months in prison.
2020, November: Paul Dunleavy, a member of the proscribed neo-Nazi terrorist organisation Feurkrieg Division, was jailed for five and a half years for preparing acts of terrorism.
2021, 1 April: PC Benjamin Hannam of the Metropolitan Police was found guilty of being a member of the proscribed neo-Nazi terrorist organisation National Action and jailed for a total of four years and four months.
2021, 15 October: Sir David Amess, Conservative MP for Southend West, was stabbed to death while attending a constituency surgery. Ali Harbi Ali, a British citizen of Somali ancestry was arrested under the Terrorism Act.

See also

 Chronology of Provisional IRA actions
 Timeline of Continuity IRA actions
 Terrorism Acts relating to Northern Ireland
 Terrorism Acts (2000–present)
 Terrorism in the United States
 List of terrorist incidents (worldwide)
 List of terrorist incidents in London
 List of people convicted under Anti-Terrorism Act in the United Kingdom
 Terrorism in the European Union

References

Terrorist incidents

Terrorist